The heats for the Women's 1500 m Freestyle race at the 2009 World Championships took place on the morning of 27 July and the final was held in the evening session of 28 July at the Foro Italico in Rome, Italy.

Records
Prior to this competition, the existing world and competition records were as follows:

The following records were established during the competition:

Heats

Final

See also
Swimming at the 2007 World Aquatics Championships – Women's 1500 metre freestyle

External links
2009 Worlds results: Women's 1500m Free Prelims from OmegaTiming.com (official timer of the 2009 World Championships); retrieved 2009-07-28.
2009 Worlds results: Women's 1500m Free Final from OmegaTiming.com (official timer of the 2009 World Championships); retrieved 2009-07-28.

Freestyle Women's 1500 m
World Aquatics Championships
2009 in women's swimming